Brigitte Irene Ahrenholz (8 August 1952 – March or April 2018) was a German rower who competed for East Germany in the 1976 Summer Olympics.

She was born in Potsdam. In 1976 she was a crew member of the East German boat that won the gold medal in the eight event. After her rowing career, she studied medicine and graduated in 1983. At first she worked at the Vivantes Klinikum im Friedrichshain as a surgeon before moving to Werder where she continued as a surgeon until her retirement.

Ahrenholz was last seen on the evening of 3 March 2018, reported to Police as missing the following morning and was found dead on 7 April 2018, aged 65. Her cause of death is currently unknown.

References

1952 births
2018 deaths
Sportspeople from Potsdam
People from Bezirk Potsdam
East German female rowers
Olympic rowers of East Germany
Rowers at the 1976 Summer Olympics
Olympic gold medalists for East Germany
Olympic medalists in rowing
Medalists at the 1976 Summer Olympics
World Rowing Championships medalists for East Germany
Recipients of the Patriotic Order of Merit in silver
European Rowing Championships medalists